The Constitution of Gabon is the basic law governing Gabon. It was adopted in 1961, rewritten in 1991 and last revised in 2011.

External links
Constitution of Gabon

Gabon
Politics of Gabon